David H. Zimmerman has been the representative of the 99th district since 2015. The 99th Pennsylvania House of Representatives District is located in Lancaster County and includes the following areas:

 Akron
 Caernarvon Township
 Earl Township
 East Earl Township
 Ephrata
 Ephrata Township
 New Holland
 Salisbury Township
 Terre Hill

Representatives

Recent election results

References

Government of Lancaster County, Pennsylvania
99